The Capitol Connection or Capitol Connection may refer to:

 The Capitol Connection, a radio show on New York politics produced by WAMC
 The Capitol Connection, a television studio operated by George Mason University
 Capital Connection (TV programme)
 Capital Connection (New Zealand train service)